Rognon is culinary French for kidney and may refer to:
 Rognon (Marne), a river in France, tributary of the Marne
 Rognon (Scey), a river in France, tributary of the Scey (Rhône basin)
 Bourdons-sur-Rognon
 Lanques-sur-Rognon 
 Rognon, Doubs
 Charles Amédée Rognon
 Rebecq-Rognon
  a rock rognon (synonym: nunatak) projecting through a glacier